Goladur (also Romanized as Goladūr) is a village in Sokmanabad Rural District, Safayyeh District, Khoy County, West Azerbaijan Province, Iran. At the 2006 census, its population was 360, in 76 families.

References 

Populated places in Khoy County